Rosina Lajo Pérez (1931 – 10 August 2022) was a Spanish politician. A member of the Socialists' Party of Catalonia, she served in the Congress of Deputies from 1977 to 1978.

Lajo died in Valladolid on 10 August 2022, at the age of 90.

References

1931 births
2022 deaths
Socialists' Party of Catalonia politicians
Members of the constituent Congress of Deputies (Spain)
People from Valladolid